In enzymology, an alanine—tRNA ligase is an enzyme that catalyzes the chemical reaction

ATP + L-alanine + tRNAAla  AMP + diphosphate + L-alanyl-tRNAAla

The 3 substrates of this enzyme are ATP, L-alanine, and tRNA(Ala), whereas its 3 products are AMP, diphosphate, and L-alanyl-tRNA(Ala).

This enzyme belongs to the family of ligases, to be specific those forming carbon-oxygen bonds in aminoacyl-tRNA and related compounds.  The systematic name of this enzyme class is L-alanine:tRNAAla ligase (AMP-forming). Other names in common use include alanyl-tRNA synthetase, alanyl-transfer ribonucleate synthetase, alanyl-transfer RNA synthetase, alanyl-transfer ribonucleic acid synthetase, alanine-transfer RNA ligase, alanine transfer RNA synthetase, alanine tRNA synthetase, alanine translase, alanyl-transfer ribonucleate synthase, AlaRS, and Ala-tRNA synthetase.  This enzyme participates in alanine and aspartate metabolism and aminoacyl-trna biosynthesis.

See also
Sticky mouse - mutation in the gene

Structural studies

References

 
 

EC 6.1.1
Enzymes of known structure